Marina Baixa or  is a comarca in the Valencian Community, Spain. It is bordered by the comarques of Comtat on the northwest, Marina Alta on the northeast, Alacantí and Alcoià on the west and the Mediterranean Sea on the east.

The interior of this comarca is mountainous, and it is dominated by the Serra d'Aitana whose highest peak is 1,500 m. The local fauna is composed by eagles, hawks, crows, blackbirds, swallows, foxes, wildcats, wild boars and many smaller animals. Rosemaries, pines, medlars and carobtrees are commonplace flora. The terrain is calcareous, so the landscape shows impressive caves and natural archways and fountains.

Tourism is the main economic resource. Fruit trees (especially orange and lemon trees), olive and almond trees are cultivated. The population of this comarca strongly increased in the last twenty years.

Municipalities
The comarca of la Marina Baixa comprises 18 municipalities, listed below with their areas and populations:

References

 
Comarques of the Valencian Community
Geography of the Province of Alicante